Big Gay Ice Cream (BGIC) is a New York City–based company that started with an ice cream truck and now operates four storefronts in the city. Co-founded by Doug Quint and Bryan Petroff, BGIC specializes in soft-serve ice cream cones, cups, and novelties with a menu of unique and unusual flavors and toppings. BGIC is part of a wider trend of gourmet and upscale food trucks popular in the United States.

BGIC has an official theme song, written and recorded by Jane Wiedlin of The Go-Go's.

Name 
The use of gay in the company name refers both to the sexual orientation of co-founders Doug Quint and Bryan Petroff and to its older, seldom-used definition, "happy". According to Quint: "If I weren't gay, I wouldn't call it the Big Gay Ice Cream Truck. And if I weren't happy, I wouldn't have the Big Gay Ice Cream Truck. It would just be the big crabby ice cream truck."

Quint and Petroff were not seeking to be hyper-political with the name; they want their customers to interpret it however they want.

History 
Doug Quint was a freelance classical bassoonist looking for a secondary occupation in the summer off-season. A flautist friend had been operating an ice cream truck of her own and suggested that Quint do the same. On June 13, 2009, the Big Gay Ice Cream Truck began operations at Brooklyn Pride in Prospect Park, Brooklyn. The ice cream truck itself has been dormant since 2011, with only occasional appearances for major events.

After two years of operating a roving truck, Quint and Petroff opened their first store – the Big Gay Ice Cream Shop, in New York's East Village. Approximately a year later, they opened a second location in the West Village. A pop-up store opened in the Ace Hotel in Los Angeles in late 2014. A Philadelphia location opened in 2015 at the corner of South and South Broad Streets.

The pair co-authored a book, titled Big Gay Ice Cream: Saucy Stories & Frozen Treats: Going All the Way with Ice Cream, with an introduction by Anthony Bourdain, released in 2015.

The business relies on social media instead of traditional advertising, in order to connect directly with its customers. Quint and Petroff also frequently blog about their experiences.

In 2017, Big Gay Ice Cream started selling packaged pints of "hard" ice cream in convenience stores and grocery stores.

See also
 List of food trucks
 Genevieve Belleveau, performance artist and operations manager of the Big Gay Ice Cream Truck

References

External links 
 Official website

Food production companies based in New York City
Food retailers of the United States
Ice cream parlors in the United States
Ice cream vans
Restaurants established in 2009
2009 establishments in New York City
American companies established in 2009